McGee Creek may refer to:
McGee Creek, California, a census designated place
McGee Creek (Missouri), a stream in Missouri
McGee Creek Reservoir, Oklahoma
McGee Creek State Park, Oklahoma